The 2017 Netball Quad Series was the second Netball Quad Series of test matches, contested by four of the five highest ranked nations in netball. Australia were the winners of the series.

Teams

Matches

Round 1

Round 2

Round 3

Standings
<noinclude>

See also

 Netball Quad Series

References

External links
  Fixtures and results for the series – Netball Australia website
 

2017
2017 in netball
2017 in Australian netball
2017 in New Zealand netball
2017 in English netball
2017 in South African women's sport
International netball competitions hosted by England
International netball competitions hosted by South Africa
January 2017 sports events in the United Kingdom
February 2017 sports events in the United Kingdom